Aces and Kings – The Best of Go West is a compilation album by English pop duo Go West, released in 1993. It contains most of the band's singles, taken from their studio albums Go West (1985), Dancing on the Couch (1987) and Indian Summer (1992), plus tracks from the remix album Bangs & Crashes (1986) and several tracks that Go West contributed to film soundtracks. Also included are two new songs that were released as singles from the album: a cover of The Miracles' "The Tracks of My Tears", which reached number 16 in the UK Singles Chart, and a remix of Go West's debut hit single, "We Close Our Eyes", which went on to reach number 40.

Track listing
All tracks written by Peter Cox and Richard Drummie, except where noted.

Note
 US version replaces "True Colours" with "Eye to Eye" (Horizontal Mix) from Bangs & Crashes & "Healing Hands" with "Still in Love" from Indian Summer.

Charts

Weekly charts

Year-end charts

Certifications

References

External links
Aces and Kings – The Best of Go West at Discogs
Aces and Kings – The Best of Go West (US CD version) at Discogs

1993 compilation albums
Go West (band) albums
Chrysalis Records compilation albums
EMI America Records albums
Albums produced by Peter Wolf
Albums produced by Ron Fair